As of February 2023, there have been 458 joint sessions and joint meetings of the United States Congress.

1780s

1790s

1800s

1810s

1820s

1830s

1840s

1850s

1860s

1870s

1880s

1890s

1900s

1910s

1920s

1930s

1940s

1950s

1960s

1970s

1980s

1990s

2000s

†John Howard's address before the Joint Meeting of Congress in 2002 was originally scheduled for September 12, 2001, but was interrupted by the September 11 attacks. He was already in Washington when the attacks occurred, and sat in on the September 12 session of the House of Representatives.

2010s

2020s

See also
List of people who have addressed both Houses of the United Kingdom Parliament

References

External links
Joint Meetings, Joint Sessions, & Inaugurations

Joint sessions
List
Articles containing video clips